Panasawanarama Purana Vihara (Sinhalese: පණසවනාරාම පුරාණ විහාරය) is a Buddhist temple in Kospillewa, Sri Lanka. The temple has been formally recognised by the Government as an archaeological site in Sri Lanka. The designation was declared on 22 November 2002 under the government Gazette number 1264.

References

Buddhist temples in Gampaha District
Archaeological protected monuments in Gampaha District